Reishia okutanii is a species of sea snail, a marine gastropod mollusk, in the family Muricidae, the murex snails or rock snails.

Distribution
This species occurs in Vietnam.

References

okutanii
Gastropods described in 2016